2012 was a leap year in the Gregorian calendar.

2012 may also refer to:

Popular culture

Film and television   
 2012 (film), a 2009 disaster film by Roland Emmerich
 Any one of a series of direct-to-DVD disaster films by The Asylum:
 2012: Doomsday (2008)
 2012: Supernova (2009)
 2012: Kurse a di Xtabai (Curse of the Xtabai), a Belizean Creole-language supernatural thriller
 2012: Time for Change, a 2010 feature-length documentary film
 Twenty Twelve, a comedy series about the 2012 Summer Olympics

Music 
2012 (1982 album), 2012
2012 (Loudness album), 2012
 2012 (Chixdiggit EP), 2016
 2012 (Ruff Sqwad EP), 2012
 "2012 (It Ain't the End)", a song by Jay Sean, featuring Nicki Minaj
 "2012", a song by The Word Alive from their album Deceiver
 "2012", a song by Burnt by the Sun from their album The Perfect Is the Enemy of the Good
 "2012", a song by Chris Brown from his album Fortune
 "2012", a song by Gossip from their album Music for Men
 "2012", a song by Ill Niño from the Enigma
 "Fast Forward To 2012", a song by A Day To Remember from their album For Those Who Have Heart
 "2012: The Demise of the 5th Sun", a song by Scar Symmetry from Symmetric in Design
 "2012 (The Pillage)", a song by Dälek from Gutter Tactics
 "2012: Return of the Feathered Serpent", a song by Therion from Sitra Ahra
 "2012 (If The World Would End)", a song by Mike Candys, featuring Evelyn and Patrick Miller, from Smile

Other
 2012 phenomenon, metaphysical prediction centered on December 21, 2012
 The 2012 Summer Olympics, held in London, United Kingdom
 The 2012 United States presidential election
 CR2012, a type of a lithium button cell battery
 Windows Server 2012, an server operating system made by Microsoft